is a railway station in the city of Komaki, Aichi Prefecture,  Japan, operated by Meitetsu.

Lines

Station layout
The station has one elevated side platform serving a single bi-directional track with the station building underneath. The station has automated ticket machines, Manaca automated turnstiles and is unattended..

Adjacent stations

|-
!colspan=5|Nagoya Railroad

Station history
Ajioka Station was opened on April 29, 1931. The tracks were elevated in 1987.

Passenger statistics
In fiscal 2017, the station was used by an average of 4576 passengers daily.

Surrounding area
Ajioka Elementary School

See also
 List of Railway Stations in Japan

References

External links

 Official web page 

Railway stations in Japan opened in 1931
Railway stations in Aichi Prefecture
Stations of Nagoya Railroad
Komaki